Avidyā is a Sanskrit word whose literal meaning is ignorance, misconceptions, misunderstandings, incorrect knowledge, and it is the opposite of Vidya. It is used extensively in Hindu texts, including the Upanishads, and in other Indian religions such as Buddhism and Jainism, particularly in the context of metaphysical reality.

Avidyā, in all Dharmic systems, represents fundamental ignorance and misperception of the phenomenal world. However, the Indian religions disagree on the details, for example with Hinduism considering a denial and misconceptions of Atman (soul, self) as a form of Avidya, and Buddhism considering the denial and misconceptions of An-atman (non-soul, non-self) as a form of Avidya.

Etymology and meaning 
Avidyā (अविद्या) is a Vedic Sanskrit word, and is a compound of "a" and "vidya", meaning "not vidya". The word vidya is derived from the Sanskrit root Vid, which means "to know, to perceive, to see, to understand". Therefore, avidya means to "not know, not perceive, not understand". The Vid*-related terms appears extensively in the Rigveda and other Vedas. Avidya is usually rendered as "ignorance" in English translations of ancient Indian texts, sometimes as "spiritual ignorance".

The word avidyā is derived from the Proto-Indo-European root *weid-, meaning "to see" or "to know". It is a cognate of Latin vidēre (which would turn to "video") and English "wit".

While Avidya found in Indian philosophies is translated as "ignorance", states Alex Wayman, this is a mistranslation because Avidya means more than ignorance. He suggests the term "unwisdom" to be a better rendition. The term includes not only ignorance out of darkness, but also obscuration, misconceptions, mistaking illusion to be reality or impermanent to be permanent or suffering to be bliss or non-self to be self (delusions). Incorrect knowledge is another form of Avidya, states Wayman.

Avidya represents fundamental ignorance, state Jones and Ryan, a misperception of the phenomenal world. In Hinduism, Avidya includes confusing the mundane reality to be the only reality, and it as a permanent though it is ever changing. Its doctrines assert that there is a spiritual reality consisting of Atman-Brahman, one that is the true, eternal, imperishable reality beyond time.

In the Vedic texts and Upanishads

Avidya in the earliest Vedic texts is ignorance, and in later Vedic texts evolves to include anything that is a "positive hindrance" to spiritual or nonspiritual knowledge. In the Upanishads, the concept includes "lack of knowledge, inadequate knowledge and false knowledge".

In Yoga Darsana 
Avidya is described in the Yoga Sutras by Patanjali, as the first of the five kleshas, the knots of affliction, and the productive field of all them that follow.

अणनत्याश णचदु्खानात्मस॥ ५॥
   
Ignorance is taking that which is non-eternal, impure, painful, and non-Self, for the eternal, pure, happy, Atman (Self).

Kriya yoga is given in II.2 as the method of liberation from Avidya and the other klesas.
The word also occurs in sutra II.24.

In Advaita Vedanta

The effect of avidya is to suppress the real nature of things and present something else in its place. In effect it is not different from Maya (pronounced Māyā) or illusion. Avidya relates to the individual Self (Ātman), while Maya is an adjunct of the cosmic Self (Brahman). In both cases it connotes the principle of differentiation of an experienced reality into the subject ('I') and an object, as is implicit in human thinking. Avidya stands for that delusion which breaks up the original unity (refer: nonduality) of what is real and presents it as subject and object and as doer and result of the deed. What keeps humanity captive in Samsara is this avidya. This ignorance,"the ignorance veiling our true self and the truth of the world", is not lack of erudition; it is ignorance about the nature of 'Being' (Sat). It is a limitation that is natural to human sensory or intellectual apparatus. This is responsible for all the misery of humanity. Advaita Vedanta holds that the eradication of it should be humanity's only goal and that will automatically mean realisation of the Self (Ātman).

Adi Shankara says in his Introduction to his commentary on the Brahma Sutras, 

In the view of his later followers, avidya cannot be categorized either as 'absolutely existent' or as 'absolutely non-existent'.

See also
 Atma Shatakam
 Avidyā (Buddhism)
 Maya (illusion)
 Kleshas (Hinduism)

Moh

References

Sources
 

Hindu philosophical concepts
Ignorance